The Catholic University of Zimbabwe (CUZ) is a Catholic Church affiliated university established in 1999 in Harare, Zimbabwe's capital city. It offers six undergraduate degree programs: Bachelor of Business Management & Information Technology (Honors), Bachelor of Business Management (Honors), Bachelor of Accounting (Honors), Bachelor of Social Science in Development Studies (Honors), Bachelor of Theology and Bachelor of Arts Dual (Honours). It also offers a variety of short courses under the Faculty of Commerce and the Faculty of Humanities.

In 2014, the university extended its reach by opening three satellite campuses in Bulawayo, Chinhoyi and Mutare.

The Catholic University plans to introduce more full-time degree programs and short courses in response to students' needs.

Values 
 Ethical behavior
 Collegiality
 Commitment
 Service
 Excellence

Faculties 
 Faculty of Commerce
 Faculty of Humanities
 Faculty of Theology

References

External links 
 The Catholic University of Zimbabwe website
 The Catholic University of Zimbabwe Facebook page
 Catholic Educational Institutions in Africa

Catholic University of Zimbabwe
Educational institutions established in 1999
Education in Harare
1999 establishments in Zimbabwe
Buildings and structures in Harare
Catholic Church in Zimbabwe
Catholic universities and colleges in Africa